Alessia Trost (born 8 March 1993) is an Italian female high jumper. She competed at the 2020 Summer Olympics, in High jump.

She won the 2009 World Youth Championship in Athletics in Bressanone. She was the bronze medallist at the 2018 IAAF World Indoor Championships.

Biography
Trost also won the Italian Youth Championship in 2008. At the first Youth Olympics 2010 she won a silver medal clearing 1.86 metres, to finish second behind Russia′s Mariya Kuchina.

On 20 January 2013 she set her personal best, third Italian best measure of all-time (after two female Italian champions, Antonietta Di Martino 2.04 m and Sara Simeoni 2.01 m), with 1.98 m in Udine, Italy. Nine days later she became the third Italian woman to jump 2.00m, and 2013 World Leader. On 26 February 2012 she won the title of the European Athletic Association, European Athletes of the Month for January.

In August, at her first appearance at the World Championships in 2013, Trost jumped 1.93 m in the high jump final without making errors, but then failed to jump 1.97 m and finished 7th.

Achievements

National titles
Trost won nine national championships at individual senior level.

Italian Athletics Championships
High jump: 2013, 2014, 2016, 2019 (4)
Italian Athletics Indoor Championships
High jump: 2013, 2014, 2016, 2018, 2021 (5)

See also
Female two metres club
Italian all-time top lists - High jump

References

External links
 

1993 births
Living people
People from Pordenone
Italian female high jumpers
Athletes (track and field) at the 2016 Summer Olympics
Olympic athletes of Italy
World Athletics Championships athletes for Italy
Athletes (track and field) at the 2010 Summer Youth Olympics
Athletics competitors of Fiamme Gialle
Italian Athletics Championships winners
Athletes (track and field) at the 2020 Summer Olympics
Sportspeople from Friuli-Venezia Giulia
21st-century Italian women